Stagg Field is an athletic field on the campus of Springfield College in Springfield, Massachusetts. With bleacher seating for 3,867, is it the home field for  Springfield College's football, field hockey, and men's and women's lacrosse team. It is also used for physical education classes and intramural sports. The Springfield College men's and women's soccer teams formerly played on the field.

Featuring the first Astroturf12 surface in the nation to be installed on a college playing field, it is plowable and used year-round. The field is lighted according to National Collegiate Athletic Association (NCAA) standards for night games and has a heated and air conditioned press box.

The field open in 1971 as Benedum Field. It was renamed in October 2007 in honor of Amos Alonzo Stagg, who came to Springfield College—then known as then known as International YMCA Training School—and initiated the school's football program. The field was resurfaced with "monofilament FieldTurf" during the summer of 2007.

Stagg Field stands on the site of the college's previous athletics stadium, Pratt Field.

Events hosted
 1995 NCAA Division II Men's Lacrosse Championship

References

College field hockey venues in the United States
College football venues
College lacrosse venues in the United States
Springfield Pride football
Sports venues in Springfield, Massachusetts
American football venues in Massachusetts
Lacrosse venues in Massachusetts
1971 establishments in Massachusetts
Sports venues completed in 1971